Raphia  may refer to:

 Raphia (moth), a genus of moths in the family Noctuidae
 Raphia (plant), the genus of raffia palms
 Raphia (town), the Ancient Greek name for Rafah, a town in Gaza
 Battle of Raphia, a major confrontation between the Ptolemaic and Seleucid empires.